Howard Balloch is a former Canadian diplomat. He was Ambassador Extraordinary and Plenipotentiary to the People's Republic of China, Mongolia and to the Democratic People's Republic of Korea. Prior to his appointment as Ambassador, he served for two years in the Privy Council Office as Deputy Secretary to the Cabinet for National Unity, a key position in the federal government up to and during the Quebec referendum on sovereignty of 1995. He was appointed to that position shortly after the Liberal Party won the federal election of 1993, and up to that time had been serving as Assistant Deputy Minister for Asia Pacific in the Department of Foreign Affairs and International Trade.  Following his retirement as ambassador in 2001, he founded The Balloch Group, a Beijing-based investment advisory and merchant banking firm.

External links 
 Foreign Affairs and International Trade Canada Complete List of Posts

Year of birth missing (living people)
Living people
Ambassadors of Canada to China
Ambassadors of Canada to Mongolia
Ambassadors of Canada to North Korea